Thru Different Eyes is a 1929 American pre-Code drama film directed by John G. Blystone and written by Tom Barry and Milton Herbert Gropper. The film stars Mary Duncan, Edmund Lowe, Warner Baxter, Natalie Moorhead, Earle Foxe and Donald Gallaher. The film was released on April 14, 1929, by Fox Film Corporation.

Plot
Harvey Manning is tried for murdering his best friend, Jack Winfield, whose body was found in the Manning home. During the trial, attorneys on both sides offer contrasting versions of Manning's character and his wife, Viola, and of the events preceding the murder. Manning is found guilty, but then a young girl comes forward and confesses to killing Winfield.

Cast      
Mary Duncan as Viola
Edmund Lowe as Harvey Manning
Warner Baxter as Jack Winfield
Natalie Moorhead as Frances Thornton
Earle Foxe as Howard Thornton
Donald Gallaher as Spencer
Florence Lake as Myrtle
Sylvia Sidney as Valerie Briand
Purnell Pratt as Dist. Atty. Marston
Selmer Jackson as King 
Dolores Johnson as Anna
Nigel De Brulier as Maynard
Lola Salvi as Maid
Stepin Fetchit as Janitor
DeWitt Jennings as Paducah
Arthur Stone as Crane
George Lamont as Traynor
Natalie Warfield as Aline Craig
Jack Jordan as Reporter
Marian Spitzer as Reporter
Stanley Blystone as Reporter
Stuart Erwin as Reporter

References

External links
 

1929 films
1920s English-language films
1929 drama films
Fox Film films
Films directed by John G. Blystone
American black-and-white films
1920s American films